Calgon is a brand of water softener produced by Reckitt.

Advertising
In Portugal, the Calgon advertisement jingle has been the same popular one for almost 30 years.

In Italy, Calgon was called Calfort from 1965 to early 2008.

Criticism 
In May 2011 a study by Which? magazine demonstrated that there was no evidence to suggest that washing machines lasted longer when treated with Calgon under "normal" washing conditions. Calgon disputes this, however. In October 2011, Dutch TROS TV program Radar also concluded Calgon water softener is not necessary under "normal" washing conditions for Dutch customers.

References

Reckitt brands
Cleaning products
American brands